Cyprien Iov (born 12 May 1989), often known simply as Cyprien, is a French comedian, actor, and YouTuber known for his short comic YouTube videos. He became known for his videos on Dailymotion under his pseudonym Monsieur Dream, before continuing to make videos on YouTube under his real name. Iov is also known for his short films uploaded onto his YouTube channel.

As of December 2020, his YouTube channel had 14 million subscribers and over 2.7 billion views, he was the most subscribed French YouTuber from 2013 to 2020 and is now the second-most, behind Squeezie.

Early work

Early life and beginnings on Dailymotion 
Cyprien Iov was born on May 12, 1989 in Nice. In April 2007, Cyprien began posting videos to Dailymotion.

References

External links 
 

1989 births
Living people
People from Nice
French humorists
French YouTubers
French people of Romanian descent
Comedy YouTubers
Male actors from Paris
French comedians
YouTube channels launched in 2007